The Cold Deck is a 1917 American silent Western film directed by and starring William S. Hart.

An incomplete copy of the film is at the Library of Congress.

Plot
As described in a film trade magazine, "Level" Leigh (Hart), a notorious gambler, endeavors to keep his profession a secret from his sister Alice (Harris), who is an invalid. He plans to win a sufficient amount of money to give her proper care and restore her health. Coralie (Rubins), a Spanish dancer, is infatuated with Leigh, but when he returns little attention she has him "cold decked" and he loses all his money. The immediate need for a physician and his lack of funds lead Leigh to hold up a stage coach, but his little sister dies. When Leigh becomes wanted for the murder of a messenger, he gives himself up even though he did not commit the murder. The citizens are planning to lynch Leigh, but one man helps him to escape. While in hiding, he unearths the money from the stage coach. Leigh brings the real murderer of the messenger, "Black Jack" Hurley (Wallock), back to town where he gets his just deserts. Leigh is urged to remain in the town, and Rose Larkin (Breamer), daughter of the murdered messenger, promises to look after him.

Cast
 William S. Hart as "Level" Leigh
 Mildred Harris as Alice Leigh
 Edwin N. Wallock as Black Jack
 Sylvia Breamer as Rose Larkin (credited as Sylvia Bremer)
 Charles O. Rush as Ace Hutton
 Alma Rubens as Coralie
 Joe Knight as Vigilante Chief

References

External links
 
 
 Poster and lantern slide at silenthollywood.com

1917 films
1917 Western (genre) films
Films directed by William S. Hart
Triangle Film Corporation films
American black-and-white films
Silent American Western (genre) films
1910s American films
1910s English-language films